Baisha is a town of Fuchuan Yao Autonomous County, Guangxi, China. , it has one residential community and 6 villages under its administration.

Administrative division
As of 2016, the town is divided into one community and six villages: 
 Baisha Community  
 Jingshan
 Mujiang
 Jiling
 Qingtian
 Chaqing
 Pingjiang

Geography
It lies at the southeastern of Fuchuan Yao Autonomous County, bordering Zhongshan County to the south and southwest, Lianshan Town to the north and northwest, and Jianghua Yao Autonomous County to the east.

The Baisha River flows through the town north to south.

Economy
The principal industries in the town are agriculture, forestry and mineral resources. Significant crops include grains, Castanea mollissima, Myrica rubra, and ginger. The region also has an abundance of tin.

Transportation
The China National Highway 207 passes across the town north to south.

References

Bibliography

Towns of Hezhou